Cavernous portion can refer to:

 Cavernous part of internal carotid artery
 Spongy urethra (also known as "cavernous portion")